SICRAL 1B is a military communications satellite built by Thales Alenia Space for Italian Armed Forces. It is a dual-use spacecraft: Telespazio will use some of the satellite's transmission capacity and some will be used by the Italian defense ministry and NATO. The spacecraft is based on the Italsat 3000 bus and includes one EHF/Ka band, three UHF-band and five active SHF-band transponders. It is designed to be operable for 13 years.

Construction 
Thales Alenia Space was the prime contractor for development and construction of the SICRAL 1B satellite.

Launch 
On April 20, 2009 Sea Launch used a Zenit-3SL to carry SICRAL 1B into a geosynchronous transfer orbit. Liftoff from the Ocean Odyssey launch platform took place at 08:16 GMT.

References 

Satellites orbiting Earth
Military satellites
Satellites of Italy
Spacecraft launched in 2009
Communications satellites of Italy